Radio Drvar is a Bosnian local public radio station, broadcasting from Drvar, Bosnia and Herzegovina.

This radio station broadcasts a variety of programs such as local news and talk shows. The program is mainly produced in Serbian.

Estimated number of potential listeners of Radio Drvar is around 6,220. Radiostation is also available in municipalities of Canton 10.

Frequencies
 Drvar

See also 
Radio Slobodni Drvar
List of radio stations in Bosnia and Herzegovina

References

External links 
 www.fmscan.org
 www.opstinadrvar.net
 Communications Regulatory Agency of Bosnia and Herzegovina

Bileća
Radio stations established in 1992